His Best Client (French: Sa meilleure cliente) is a 1932 French comedy film directed by Pierre Colombier and starring Elvire Popesco, René Lefèvre and Hélène Robert.

The film's sets were designed by the art director Jacques Colombier.

Synopsis
A pair of lovers open a beauty salon, but struggling for business they decide to pretend that she is really his mother and has been rejuvenated by a miraculous treatment they have.

Cast
 Elvire Popesco as Edwige 
 René Lefèvre as Gaston 
 Hélène Robert as Hélène Chervin 
 André Lefaur as Monsieur Chervin 
 Charles Prince as Larnois 
 Marcelle Monthil as Mlle. Yvonne 
 Henri Kerny as Martin 
 Noël Darzal as Jiimmy 
 Yvonne Mirval as La vieille anglaise 
 André Alerme
 Paul Bertrand
 Georges Bever 
 Frank O'Neill
 Mercédès Brare
 Louise Dauville
 Jeanne Juillia
 Marthe Riche

References

Bibliography 
 Dayna Oscherwitz & MaryEllen Higgins. The A to Z of French Cinema. Scarecrow Press, 2009.

External links 
 

1932 films
French comedy films
1932 comedy films
1930s French-language films
Films directed by Pierre Colombier
Pathé films
French black-and-white films
1930s French films